Ken Griffey Jr.'s Winning Run is a baseball video game developed by Rare for the Super Nintendo Entertainment System that is named after the baseball player Ken Griffey Jr. It is the follow-up to Nintendo's previous Ken Griffey Jr. Presents Major League Baseball. Two years later, Nintendo released another game featuring Griffey, Major League Baseball Featuring Ken Griffey Jr., for the Nintendo 64.

The game's title is derived from the final play of the 1995 American League Division Series featuring the Seattle Mariners and New York Yankees. On a play that is sometimes credited with "saving baseball in Seattle," Griffey scored the game's winning run all the way from first base, on a close play in the bottom of the 11th inning.

Due to the lack of a Major League Baseball Players' Association license, Griffey is the only player in the game to use his actual name.

Gameplay

The game features the 28 MLB teams in existence at the time, though playing through a full 162 game season unlocks the option to play against the two 1998 expansion teams, the Tampa Bay Devil Rays and the Arizona Diamondbacks. The game includes a franchise mode, MLB Challenge mode, exhibition (single-game) play, and All-Star Game mode, which includes a home run derby mode. Unlike its predecessor, most of the stadiums in the game are generic and the Houston Astros play on natural grass at the Astrodome. From the batter's box most of the other stadiums look authentic but once the ball goes towards the warning track, the outfield walls on either side have a big wall and left center/centerfield/right center have a small outfield wall. At Wrigley Field the ivy is visible from the batters box, but once the ball goes towards the outfield wall there is no signature green ivy.

This was one of the first video games to have alternate uniforms for a sports game. The computer randomly selects either the standard home and away, or a "colored" alternate. In some cases the home team will be in their gray uniform while the away team will be in an alternate or standard home white.

Homeruns are much harder than in its predecessor, as pitching is the main key to this game.

Reception

Ken Griffey Jr.'s Winning Run was well received by critics.

Air Hendrix gave the game a nearly perfect score in GamePro: 5 out of 5 in both graphics and sound, and 4.5 out of 5 in control and FunFactor. He summarized that "With realistic, action-packed gameplay and superb graphics, Winning Run strolls easily over home plate." He felt that the game retains its authentic feel despite Griffey being the only real player, since the abilities and appearances of the fictitious players are modeled after their real world counterparts.

The two sports reviewers of Electronic Gaming Monthly gave the game a unanimous score of 8 out of 10, saying that it has greatly improved graphics and player animations over the original (Ken Griffey Jr. Presents Major League Baseball). A reviewer for Next Generation lauded the rich color, smooth and "seriously wacky" animation, immersive sound, easily mastered interface, and the retention of the solid arcade-style gameplay of the original game. He concluded, "If you own a Super NES and even just kind of like baseball, then this is the one." IGN ranked the game 52nd on their Top 100 SNES Games.

References

External links
Ken Griffey Jr.'s Winning Run at NinDB
Ken Griffey Jr.'s Winning Run at GameFAQs
Ken Griffey Jr.'s Winning Run at MobyGames
Instruction booklet at Giant Bomb

1996 video games
Ken Griffey Jr. video games
Major League Baseball video games
North America-exclusive video games
Rare (company) games
Super Nintendo Entertainment System games
Super Nintendo Entertainment System-only games
Video games scored by Eveline Fischer Novakovic
Multiplayer and single-player video games
Video games developed in the United Kingdom